Cornel Predescu (born 21 December 1987) is a Romanian former footballer who played as a winger for teams such as: Dinamo București, Unirea Urziceni, Aris Limassol, ASU Politehnica Timișoara or CS Balotești, among others.

International
Cornel Predescu has been capped with the Romanian U21 team two times.

Honours

Club
Dinamo București
Liga I: winner 2007

Pandurii
Liga I: runner-up 2013

References

External links
 
 
 

1987 births
Living people
Footballers from Bucharest
Romanian footballers
Association football midfielders
Liga I players
Liga II players
Cypriot First Division players
Ekstraklasa players
Kategoria Superiore players
FC Dinamo București players
FC Unirea Urziceni players
ACF Gloria Bistrița players
CS Otopeni players
FC Astra Giurgiu players
CS Pandurii Târgu Jiu players
Aris Limassol FC players
Zawisza Bydgoszcz players
LPS HD Clinceni players
KF Skënderbeu Korçë players
SSU Politehnica Timișoara players
CS Balotești players
Expatriate footballers in Cyprus
Expatriate footballers in Poland
Expatriate footballers in Albania
Romanian expatriate footballers
Romanian expatriate sportspeople in Poland
Romanian expatriate sportspeople in Albania
Romanian expatriate sportspeople in Cyprus
Romania under-21 international footballers